Christ on the Cross with the Virgin and Saint John is an oil on panel painting, later transferred to canvas, attributed to the Master of the Grimacing St John, a senior member of the workshop of Jan van Eyck. It was long attributed to Jan's brother Hubert, based on stylistic similarities to portions of the "Adoration of the lamb" passage in the Ghent Altarpiece. The Master of the Grimacing St John is one of only two assistant of van Eyck's whose hand can be identified across several works. He takes his notname from an imitation stone statue in a grisaille diptych wing panel of St. John the Baptist, opposite a Virgin and Child, and is associated with a pen and pencil drawing of St Paul in Vienna.

The Master of the Grimacing St John's panel has been in the Gemäldegalerie, Berlin since 1897.

Notes

Sources
 Muchembled, Robert. Cultural Exchange in Early Modern Europe, Volume 4. Cambridge: Cambridge University Press, 2007. 
 Borchert, Till-Holger. Van Eyck. London: Taschen, 2008. 

1430s paintings
van Eyck (studio)
Paintings of the Virgin Mary